Judith Wiesner won in the final 6–1, 6–2 against Sylvia Hanika.

Seeds
A champion seed is indicated in bold text while text in italics indicates the round in which that seed was eliminated. The top eight seeds received a bye to the second round.

  Sylvia Hanika (final)
  Sandra Cecchini (semifinals)
  Raffaella Reggi (third round)
  Arantxa Sánchez (second round)
  Bettina Fulco (semifinals)
  Judith Wiesner (champion)
  Isabel Cueto (second round)
  Nathalie Tauziat (third round)
  Patricia Tarabini (third round)
  Neige Dias (quarterfinals)
  Sabrina Goleš (second round)
 n/a
  Julie Halard (second round)
  Nathalie Herreman (first round)
 n/a
 n/a

Draw

Finals

Top half

Section 1

Section 2

Bottom half

Section 3

Section 4

References
 1988 WTA Aix-en-Provence Open Draw

WTA Aix-en-Provence Open
1988 WTA Tour